Ma Liu Shui San Tsuen, sometimes transliterated as Ma Niu Shui San Tsuen, is a village in Fanling, North District, Hong Kong.

Administration
Ma Liu Shui San Tsuen is a recognized village under the New Territories Small House Policy.

References

External links
 Delineation of area of existing village Ma Niu Shui San Tsuen (Fanling) for election of resident representative (2019 to 2022)

Villages in North District, Hong Kong
Fanling